This is a list of player signings and releases involving Super Rugby teams prior to the end of the 2014 Super Rugby season. The release of a player that was included in a 2013 Super Rugby season squad, or the signing of a new player for the 2014 season is listed here regardless of when it occurred. Players that have been confirmed for the 2014 season are also listed, regardless of when they signed for the team.

Australian and New Zealand teams name their squads for the 2014 season – typically containing 30 players – in late 2013. Many sides also name additional players that train in backup or development squads for the franchises. These players are denoted by (wider training group) for New Zealand teams, or (extended playing squad) for Australian teams. In South Africa, all teams have affiliated provincial sides playing in their domestic Vodacom Cup competition.

Notes:
 2013 players listed are all players that were named in the initial senior squad, or subsequently included in a 22-man match day squad at any game during the season.
(did not play) denotes that a player did not play at all during one of the two seasons due to injury or non-selection. These players are included to indicate they were contracted to the team.
(short-term) denotes that a player wasn't initially contracted, but came in during the season. This could either be a club rugby player coming in as injury cover, or a player whose contract had expired at another team (typically in the northern hemisphere). 
 Flags are only shown for players moving to or from another country.
 Players may play in several positions, but are listed in only one.

Australia

Brumbies

Force

Rebels

Reds

Waratahs

New Zealand

Blues

Chiefs

Crusaders

Highlanders

Hurricanes

South Africa

Bulls

Cheetahs

Kings
The Kings will be replaced in the 2014 Super Rugby season by the Lions. All players returned to the domestic  team unless stated.

Lions
The Lions joined the 2014 Super Rugby season at the expense of the Kings. All players joined from  unless stated.

Sharks

Stormers

See also
 List of 2012–13 Super Rugby transfers
 List of 2014–15 Super Rugby transfers
 SANZAAR
 Super Rugby franchise areas

References

2013
2014 Super Rugby season
2013 Super Rugby season